Rub It In is a country album by Billy "Crash" Craddock. It was released in 1974 on ABC Records. It was produced by Ron Chancey. The album yielded two singles that went to #1 on the country music charts, "Rub It In" and "Ruby Baby".

Track listing
 "Rub It In"
 "Walk When Love Walks"
 "Ruby Baby"
 "Stop! If You Love Me"
 "Farmer's Daughter"
 "Quarter 'Til 3"
 "Walk Your Kisses"
 "It's Hard to Love a Hungry, Worried Man"
 "Arkansas Red"
 "Home Is Such a Lonely Place to Go"

Charts

References

Billy "Crash" Craddock albums
1974 albums
Albums produced by Ron Chancey
ABC Records albums